Kimberly-Ann Collins (born 1992) is an American politician serving as a member of the Missouri House of Representatives from the 77th district. Elected in November 2020, she assumed office on January 6, 2021.

Early life and education 
Collins was born and raised in St. Louis. Collins’s brother, John Collins Muhammad is a St. Louis Alderman for District 21. Her mother is Dr. LaTonia Smith, President of Harris-Stowe State College. She earned a Bachelor of Science degree in public health science, with a minor in chemistry, from the University of Missouri–Kansas City.

Career 
Prior to entering politics, Collins worked for PotBangerz, a non-profit community justice organization, RedBike, and City Hope STL. She was elected to the Missouri House of Representatives in November 2020 and assumed office on January 6, 2021.

Electoral history

References 

1992 births
Living people
People from St. Louis
Politicians from St. Louis
Democratic Party members of the Missouri House of Representatives
University of Missouri–Kansas City alumni
Women state legislators in Missouri
African-American state legislators in Missouri
21st-century African-American people
21st-century African-American women